Kumarimuthu (20 December 1940 – 28 February 2016) was a Tamil film character actor, comedian and politician of the Dravida Munnetra Kazhagam (DMK). He was known for his unique comical laugh.

Career
Kumarimuthu starred in 728 films in his career spanning over three decades. He usually played comic roles and was known for his trademark laugh. He was a member of the political party Dravida Munnetra Kazhagam (DMK). Kumarimuthu was also a member of Nadigar Sangam and was involved in a controversy where he was expelled from the Nadigar Sangam over allegations of speaking negatively about the association, after he questioned the intent behind the land lease and building demolition.

Death
He died at the age of 75 on 28 February 2016 due to age-related ailments.

Partial filmography

References

Tamil comedians
Male actors in Tamil cinema
People from Kanyakumari district
2016 deaths
1940 births